The 1980 Can Am Series season was the thirteenth running of the Sports Car Club of America's prototype based series and the fourth running of the revived series. Patrick Tambay was declared champion, winning six of the ten rounds and finishing third at Riverside. Chevrolet again swept the season. Lola, Holbert, and Prophet were the dominant chassis suppliers, with Intrepid finishing second at Watkins Glen and Frisbee finishing first at Laguna Seca.

The two liter class went to Gary Gove in his Ralt RT2.

Results

References

Can-Am seasons
Can-Am
Can-Am
Can-Am